That's Incredible! is an American reality television show that aired on the ABC television network from 1980 to 1984.  In the tradition of You Asked for It, Ripley's Believe It or Not! and Real People, the show featured people performing stunts and reenactments of allegedly paranormal events.  The show also often featured people with unusual talents, such as speed-talker John Moschitta, Jr., who made his first national television appearance on the show, as well as scientific, medical, and technological breakthroughs such as the Taser and cryogenic corneal reshaping by lathe keratomileusis. The show's catchphrase said by one of its hosts at the conclusion of a particularly amazing segment was the same as its title: "That's incredible!"

Despite accusations of being "sadistic", the series was a huge success and influenced many entertainers.

Synopsis
The show was co-hosted by Fran Tarkenton, John Davidson,  and Cathy Lee Crosby, and was produced by Alan Landsburg Productions.  Originally aired as an hour-long program, episodes were later re-edited into 30 minute segments for syndication.  It debuted on March 3, 1980.

A number of the stunts performed were dangerous, including juggling knives, staying inside a small box for hours, and one involving a man supposedly catching a bullet between his teeth.  The dangerous nature of these stunts eventually prompted producers to augment the footage with the caption "Do Not Try This Yourself".  Steve Baker, also known as "Mr. Escape", was frequently featured on the show.

The show has been cited as an influence on hip-hop culture in New Zealand, where much television programming in the 1980s was American.  In 1983 the show featured several dancing crews, giving youth of Pacific Island and Maori heritage, many of whom were interested in hip-hop culture and dance, a sense of connectedness to global youth culture. In the early 1980s, Army Lt. Col. Earl Woods (Ret.) brought his five-year-old son Eldrick to That's Incredible, showing his ability to putt a golf ball into a hole from different areas. Eldrick is now better known by his nickname Tiger.

Nielsen ratings
The show ranked in the top 30 for its first four seasons, and ranked at #3 during its first season, but fell out of the top 50 during its final season.

 1979–80: #3  (25.8 rating)
 1980–81: #22 (20.5 rating)
 1981–82: #28 (18.4 rating)
 1982–83: #22 (18.3 rating)
 1983–84: #58 (14.6 rating)

Spin-off
Those Amazing Animals is a reality television series about animals and their extraordinary lives. It was hosted by Burgess Meredith, Priscilla Presley and Jim Stafford. Also appearing were explorer Jacques-Yves Cousteau, undersea photographers Ron and Valerie Taylor, and Joan Embery of the San Diego Zoo. The series aired on ABC on Sunday nights from August 24, 1980, to August 23, 1981.

Revival
That's Incredible! was revived for the 1988–89 season, hosted by Davidson, Cristina Ferrare, and Tracey Gold, as Incredible Sunday.

Syndication
The show was seen weekends on Retro Television Network. It was also broadcast overseas in Australia.

See also
 Is It Possible? - a similar show on the Discovery Channel

References

External links

American Broadcasting Company original programming
Television series by Alan Landsburg Productions
1980s American reality television series
1980 American television series debuts
1984 American television series endings
English-language television shows